Savoyen can refer to:

 Carel van Savoyen (1620/21–1665), a Flemish painter
 Mondeuse noire, a red French wine grape variety